Malcolm Holmes (born 28 July 1960 in Birkenhead, England) is a British drummer. He is best known for being the original drummer with Orchestral Manoeuvres in the Dark.

Biography
Holmes’ first drumming sessions were for the Id, who included future members of OMD. He also played on sessions for the Pale Fountains, Dalek I Love You, the Lightning Seeds and Margi Clarke, a.k.a. Margox in the late 1970s. He joined OMD in 1980.

He played on over 130 of the band's songs as well contributing live performances at hundreds of OMD concerts. On his first Top of the Pops TV performance in 1980, he performed standing up, playing an electronic drum kit. He used a home made electronic drum kit for live performances before they became available to the mass market.

He rejoined OMD when they reformed in 2006.

In July 2013, while touring with OMD in Toronto, in reported stage temperatures of above 45 degrees Celsius, he collapsed during a show. They subsequently left the stage, where Holmes' heart stopped. The band later announced the cancellation of the rest of their tour, which included a headlining slot at Rewind Festival in Scotland on 28 July 2013, his 53rd birthday.

After making a steady recovery over the following months, Holmes has continued to work in the music industry.

References

1960 births
British male drummers
English rock drummers
English new wave musicians
People from Birkenhead
Orchestral Manoeuvres in the Dark members
Living people